Ridhwan Osman is a retired footballer who last played  for Woodlands Wellington in the S.League.

Ridhwan was part of the Young Lions team which represented Singapore in the inaugural edition of the Thanh Nien Cup in 2007, helping the Young Lions achieve a second runner-up position in the regional U-21 international football tournament which is held annually in Vietnam.

Club career

Previously turning out for Home United when he was serving his national service in 2010, Ridhwan featured prominently for Balestier Khalsa in 2011 before switching to Hougang United in 2012.

On 2 January 2013, it was announced by Woodlands Wellington that Ridhwan will join them for the 2013 season.

He made his debut for Woodlands Wellington on 26 February 2013 in a 2-1 loss against Harimau Muda B, coming on as a second-half substitute for Armanizam Dolah.

Ridhwan retired from professional football at the end of 2013 season.

Club career statistics

Ridhwan Osman's Profile

All numbers encased in brackets signify substitute appearances.

References

1987 births
Living people
Singaporean footballers
Woodlands Wellington FC players
Home United FC players
Balestier Khalsa FC players
Hougang United FC players
Singapore Premier League players
Association football midfielders